Robin Tunney (born June 19, 1972) is an American actress. Tunney made her film debut in the comedy Encino Man (1992) and rose to prominence with leading roles in the cult films Empire Records (1995) and The Craft (1996). Her performance in Niagara, Niagara (1997) won her acclaim and the Volpi Cup for Best Actress. She had leading roles in the films End of Days (1999), Supernova and Vertical Limit (both 2000). Tunney earned critical acclaim for playing Veronica Donovan on Prison Break (2005–2006) and Teresa Lisbon on the television series The Mentalist (2008–2015).

Tunney was praised for her portrayal of a victim of sexual assault in the independent drama Open Window (2006). Her subsequent film roles across the 2000s include Cherish and The Secret Lives of Dentists (both 2002), The In-Laws (2003), Hollywoodland (2006), August and The Burning Plain (both 2008), and Passenger Side (2009). She led the thriller film Looking Glass (2018), and starred in the short-lived legal drama series The Fix (2019).

Early life
Tunney was born in Chicago, Illinois, to a car salesman father, Patrick, and a bartender mother, Cathy. Tunney's father was born in Straide, County Mayo, Ireland, while her maternal grandparents were from Clare Island. She is a cousin of Chicago Alderman Tom Tunney.

Tunney grew up in Orland Park, a southwest suburb of Chicago. She was raised Catholic (of Irish descent), attended Saint Ignatius College Prep in Chicago and the Chicago Academy for the Arts in Chicago, and resided in Palos Heights, also in the Chicago area.

Career
Tunney moved to Los Angeles and was cast in roles in Class of '96, Law & Order, Dream On, and Life Goes On amongst other works. She appeared in the film Empire Records, released in 1995, which polarized critics and audiences. Tunney realized subsequent success in the role of Sarah Bailey in horror-fantasy film The Craft, which she starred in alongside Fairuza Balk, Neve Campbell and Rachel True. The movie was a commercial success, earning $55 million against a budget of $15 million. She later led the independent film Niagara, Niagara which was released in 1997, and earned her critical praise; she won the Volpi Cup for Best Actress at the 1997 Venice International Film Festival. She was also featured opposite Arnold Schwarzenegger in the 1999 supernatural action film End of Days.

Tunney appeared in the 2004 pilot episode of the medical drama series House as a kindergarten instructor who suffers from an aphasic condition. She subsequently portrayed Veronica Donovan on the first season of Prison Break, which was released in 2005 to critical acclaim. Tunney appeared in 2007's Closing the Ring. The year following, she played Teresa Lisbon on the television series The Mentalist, a role that she played for seven years. In 2018, she led the thriller film Looking Glass alongside Nicolas Cage, which was negatively received although her performance earned praise. In 2019, she starred in the short-lived legal drama series The Fix.

On June 28, 2006, Tunney won her table in the eighth tournament series of Bravo's Celebrity Poker Showdown, moving on to the final table. The finale aired on July 5, 2006, where she finished second to Jason Alexander, earning $200,000 for her charity of choice, The Children's Health Fund. In August 2006, Tunney played in the World Series of Poker after having her entrance fee covered by the online cardroom PokerRoom.com.

Personal life
Tunney married producer and director Bob Gosse on October 4, 1997, and divorced in 2006. Tunney was engaged to Australian writer and director Andrew Dominik from 2009 to 2010. Tunney became engaged to Nicky Marmet on December 25, 2012, while on vacation in Rio de Janeiro. They have two children.

Filmography

Film

Television

Awards and nominations

References

External links

1972 births
20th-century American actresses
21st-century American actresses
Actresses from Chicago
American film actresses
American people of Irish descent
American television actresses
Living people
People from Orland Park, Illinois
People from Palos Heights, Illinois
St. Ignatius College Prep alumni
Volpi Cup for Best Actress winners